The 1945 Rutgers Queensmen football team represented Rutgers University in the 1945 college football season. In their eighth and final season under head coach Harry Rockafeller, the Queensmen compiled a 5–2 record, won the Middle Three Conference championship, and outscored their opponents 140 to 61. The team's only losses came against Swarthmore (6–13) and Princeton (6–14).  In November 1945, Rockafeller announced that he would step down as the head coach at the end of the 1945 season.

Schedule

References

Rutgers
Rutgers Scarlet Knights football seasons
Rutgers Queensmen football